The Bi-State Conference, also known as Region II, is a junior college athletic conference for many technical and community colleges within the South Central states of Arkansas and Oklahoma, sponsored by the National Junior College Athletic Association (NJCAA). Conference championships are held in most sports and individuals can be named to All-Conference and All-Academic teams.

Member schools

Current members
The Bi-State currently has 21 full members, all but one are public schools:

Notes

Future members

Notes

Former members

Notes

See also
 National Junior College Athletic Association

References

External links
 NJCAA official website
 NJCAA Region 2 official website

NJCAA conferences